Gerald Ward Cottle (7 April 1945 – 13 January 2021) was a British circus owner and the owner of the Wookey Hole Caves in Somerset. He presented the Moscow State Circus and Chinese State Circus in Britain, founded Gerry Cottle's Circus, and co-founded The Circus of Horrors.

Early life
Gerry Cottle was born in Carshalton, Surrey. His father was a stockbroker and grand-master in the Freemasons. Gerry Cottle was educated at Rutlish School, Merton Park, south London and left home in 1961 at the age of 16 to join the Robert Brothers Circus.

Circus career
Cottle started by doing menial tasks, but worked his way up to have his own juggling act, billed as Gerry Melville the Teenage Juggler,  and then to own his own show, which opened in July 1970, with just five performers. He established his Big Top in 1974 and ran it until 2003. By the mid-1970s the Gerry Cottle Circus was touring Britain with three shows. In 1975 he purchased a unimproved plot in Surrey for £40,000 and lived there for 30 years, eventually selling it for £3m. He also presented the Moscow State Circus and Chinese State Circus in Britain. In 1995, he co-created The Circus of Horrors with Doktor Haze which debuted at the Glastonbury Festival and has toured the world since then. This was a collaborative venture with Archaos, a French contemporary circus.

In 2003 he auctioned off much of his circus paraphernalia in order to concentrate on running Wookey Hole Caves, a tourist attraction in Somerset. In 2012 he celebrated fifty years in the business with a new show, Turbo Circus: 50 Acts In 100 Minutes, on a 31-week tour. Cottle and his Magic Circus undertook another months-long tour in 2017.

Animal acts
Gerry Cottle's Circus originally toured with a variety of animals including horses, zebras, elephants, lions, tigers, monkeys, and llamas. The 1980s saw an increase in public opinion against animal acts. Cottle sold his last elephant and by the end of 1993 had a non-animal circus. In 2012 he said that he now reluctantly supports the ban on circus animal acts, which he says will improve the image of circuses in Britain.

Wookey Hole
After purchasing Wookey Hole Caves, a tourist attraction that featured show caves, penny arcades and restaurants, he added a theatre, circus museum, hotel and circus school. At the latter, local youth were trained in a wide range of circus skills, and performed at the theatre and in Cottle's touring show Turbo Circus.

Personal life
He married Betty Fossett, youngest daughter of circus showman Jim Fossett, in 1968. The couple had three daughters and a son. In the 1980s he became addicted to cocaine and was jailed. His daughters set up Cottle Sisters Circus. He was separated from Betty and had another partner, Anna Carter of Carters Steam Fair. They had also separated.

Cottle was the guest for BBC Radio 4's Desert Island Discs on 15 September 1984. His choices included the "Radetzky March" by Johann Strauss Sr., and Help! by the Beatles. His favourite was "American Pie" by Don McLean.

Death
Cottle died in hospital in Bath, Somerset, in January 2021, aged 75, after contracting COVID-19 during the COVID-19 pandemic in the United Kingdom.

References

External links
 Wookey Hole Caves
 "Confessions of a Showman: My Life in the Circus" by Gerry Cottle with Helen Batten at Goodreads
 "Gerry Cottle, circus showman, dies of coronavirus at 75" - obituary at The Daily Telegraph 

1945 births
2021 deaths
Circus owners
Deaths from the COVID-19 pandemic in England
People educated at Rutlish School
People from Carshalton